All That Jazz is the debut studio album by English pop band Breathe. Originally scheduled for release in October 1987, the album was issued first in the United States on 24 August 1987, ahead of the United Kingdom and other markets. The album peaked at #22 on the U.K. Albums Chart and at #34 on the U.S. Billboard 200. It has been certified Gold in the U.S. by the RIAA, Gold in Canada and Silver in the U.K. by the BPI.

A number of the album's tracks were recorded in 1985 with producer Bob Sargeant. The group's first British single, "Don't Tell Me Lies", was released in January 1986 and reached No. 77 on the U.K. Singles Chart. In 1987, Chris Porter was brought on board to produce, and the band continued working on the rest of the tracks to be included on All That Jazz. "Don't Tell Me Lies" was not featured on the initial U.K. release of the album (though an edited dance version was included on the US version and later album pressings worldwide).  In May 1987, "Jonah" became the band's first U.S. single, and third in the U.K., but failed to chart in either territory.

The biggest hit single from the album was "Hands to Heaven", which reached No. 4 in the UK and No. 2 on the US pop chart. Other singles from the album include three UK-only tracks - "All That Jazz", "Any Trick", and a re-release of "Jonah," - along with "How Can I Fall?", a re-release of "Don't Tell Me Lies", and "All This I Should Have Known" (U.S. only).

On 25 February 2013, a Deluxe Edition of the album was issued by Cherry Pop Records.

Track listings

In the United States, A&M Records substituted track 9 "For Love or Money" with a special edit of the extended dance mix of “Don’t Tell Me Lies,” remixed by John Morales.
When Siren Records re-released All That Jazz on 26 September 1988, the U.S. edit of "Don't Tell Me Lies" was added to the album as track 6. A new cover design replaced the original, which had included since-departed fourth band member Michael Delahunty. The U.K. & European cassette version of the re-released album added "In All Honesty" as track B6. After initial American pressings sold out, A&M started using the new U.K. cover design, but maintained the original U.S. tracklisting. Virgin Canada favoured the expanded U.K. tracklisting and packaged the album in a new cover that featured a seductively entwined couple caught mid-tango. For a brief period, this cover also appeared on some European and South American pressings.

The 2-CD Deluxe Edition, released in 2013, built upon the UK re-release. On disc 1, tracks 1 to 11 were retained in their original configuration, with an extra 8 tracks following. Disc 2 featured an additional 14 tracks consisting of 5 non-album b-sides, and 9 remixes. Of the 33 tracks, 14 had not previously been available on CD (*).

Personnel

Band 

David Glasper: vocals
Marcus Lillington: guitars, keyboards
Michael Delahunty: bass
Ian "Spike" Spice: drums, percussion

Production

Produced by Paul Staveley O'Duffy, Chris Porter, and Bob Sargeant
Engineers: John Gallen, John Madden, Chris Porter
Mixing: Michael Brauer, Chris Porter
Remix: Bob Kraushaar
Mastering: Tim Young
Mastering (Deluxe Edition): Alan Wilson

Chart performance

In the US, All That Jazz spent 51 weeks in the Billboard 200, from June 4, 1988, with a peak at No. 34 on 24 December 1988. In the UK, the album debuted at its peak position of #22 on 8 October 1988, dropping from the chart 5 weeks later.  Spending 5 weeks also on the Swedish albums chart from 11 January 1989, All That Jazz reached #12 on 8 February 1989. In Canada, the album spent twenty-six weeks on the RPM 100 albums chart, achieving its highest position of #43 on 26 November 1988. In Germany, All That Jazz peaked at #50 for two weeks from 20 February 1989.

Certifications

All That Jazz was certified Gold in the United States on 21 November 1988, Silver in the United Kingdom on 14 April 1989, and Gold in Canada on 21 April 1989.

Singles 
All That Jazz generated nine singles, including two re-releases. Four of these issues were made in both the United States and Britain, with another exclusive to the U.S. and four not released in the United States.

Three singles failed to chart in any territory, while the final single "All This I Should Have Known", released only in the U.S., reached No. 34 on the Billboard Adult Contemporary chart.

References

External links
Album release info at discogs.com
Deluxe Edition release info at discogs.com

1987 debut albums
Breathe (British band) albums
A&M Records albums
Virgin Records albums
Albums produced by Bob Sargeant